Iron Man, Ironman or Ironmen may refer to:

Nathaniel "Iron Man" Avery (1939–1985), American caddie for Arnold Palmer
Travis Fulton (1977–2021), American mixed martial arts fighter
Gunnar Graps (1951–2004), Estonian musician
Mick Murphy (cyclist) (1934–2015), Irish cyclist
Vallabhbhai Patel (1875–1950), Indian independence activist and former Deputy Prime Minister of India
Cal Ripken Jr. (born 1960), American Major League Baseball player
Ivan Stewart (born 1945), American off-road racing driver
Billy Williams (born 1938), American Major League Baseball player

Films

Marvel Cinematic Universe 
Iron Man (2008 film), an American live-action film based on the Marvel character
Tony Stark (Marvel Cinematic Universe), the character as depicted in the media franchise
Iron Man 2, the 2010 sequel to the film
Iron Man 3, the 2013 sequel

Other films 
The Iron Man (serial), a 1924 film serial
The Iron Man, or A Man of Iron, a 1925 silent film
The Iron Man (1930 film), a 1930 animated film
Iron Man (1931 film), directed by Tod Browning
Iron Man (1951 film), based on the novel by W.R. Burnett
Iron Man, or Tieren, a 1964 Chinese film about Wang Jinxi
Tetsuo: The Iron Man, a 1989 Japanese film
Tetsujin 28: The Movie (2005), Japanese film based on the 1956 manga series Tetsujin 28-go
Iron Man (2009 film), a 2009 Chinese film about Wang Jinxi

Games 
Iron Man (video game), a 2008 video game based on the film
Ironman (computer gaming), a game mode in some computer games wherein savescumming (reloading to get a better outcome) or other features such as trading with other players (in multiplayer games) are disabled
Iron Man VR, a virtual reality video game for the PlayStation VR headset

Comics 
Iron Man, a Marvel Comics superhero
Iron Man (comic book), the name of several comic book titles featuring the Marvel Comics character
 List of Iron Man titles
Iron Man (Canadian comics), a pioneering Canadian comics character
 Tetsujin 28, a character from the manga series that debuted in 1956 Tetsujin 28-go ("Iron Man No. 28")

Music 
Iron Man (band), an American doom metal band
Iron Man (Eric Dolphy album), a 1963 album by Eric Dolphy
"Iron Man" (song), a 1970 song by Black Sabbath
Iron Man (soundtrack), a 2008 soundtrack album
Iron Man: The Best of Black Sabbath, a compilation album by Black Sabbath
"Iron Man", a song by The Tansads
Ironman (Ghostface Killah album), a 1996 album by Ghostface Killah
The Iron Man: The Musical by Pete Townshend, an album by Pete Townshend
"The Iron Man", a song by Tom Paxton

Sculpture and statues 
Iron:Man, a 1993 sculpture by Antony Gormley, in Birmingham, England
Iron Man (Buddhist statue), Tibetan statue considered a forgery by experts
Iron Man (Minnesota statue), a 1987 statue in Chisholm, Minnesota

Television 
Iron Man (anime), a 2010 television series
Iron Man (TV series), a 1994 animated series
Iron Man: Armored Adventures, a TV CGI animated series
 Tetsujin 28, a character from the anime series that debuted in 1960 Tetsujin 28-go ("Iron Man No. 28")
Tetsujin 28-go (2000 TV series), based on the 1956 manga series Tetsujin 28-go
"Iron Man" Carmichael, alter ego of Lucille Carmichael on three episodes of The Lucy Show
The Invincible Iron Man, part of 1966 The Marvel Super Heroes cartoon series.

Literature
Iron Man: The Defiant Reign of Jean Chrétien, a 2003 biography of Canadian Prime Minister Jean Chrétien
Ironman (novel), a 1995 novel by Chris Crutcher
The Iron Man (novel), a 1968 novel by Ted Hughes
Iron Man, a 1930 novel by William R. Burnett
Iron Man: My Journey through Heaven and Hell with Black Sabbath, a 2011 autobiography by Black Sabbath founding member Tony Iommi
"The Iron Man", a short story in the 1976 The Iron Man & Other Tales of the Ring by Robert E. Howard
Iron Man (magazine), a bodybuilding and weight-training magazine

Sports
Ironman Triathlon, a long-distance triathlon
Ironman World Championship
Iron man (sports streak), an athlete of unusual physical endurance
Iron man match, a type of a professional wrestling match
Ironman curling, an annual outdoor curling event in Manitoba, Canada
Ironman football, an American football system where player substitutions were limited
1926 Brown Bears football team or "the Iron Men", which used player substitutions sparingly
1939 Iowa Hawkeyes football team, nicknamed the "Ironmen" because a number of Hawkeyes played 60-minute games
Ironman (surf lifesaving), a multi-disciplinary surf lifesaving event
Seattle Ironmen, a 1944–1952 ice hockey franchise in the Pacific Coast Hockey League
South Wales Ironmen, the name used in the 2017 season by rugby league club West Wales Raiders
Walsh Jesuit Ironman, a high school wrestling tournament
Mascot of Danville High School, Danville, Pennsylvania. Usually pluralized as "the Ironmen"

Watches
Ironman Datalink, a Timex wristwatch introduced in 1997 and marketed in conjunction with the Ironman Triathlon
Timex Ironman, a digital wristwatch marketed in conjunction with the Ironman Triathlon

See also

 Man of Iron (disambiguation)
 Iron Woman (disambiguation)
 Steelman (disambiguation)
 Iron (disambiguation)
 Man (disambiguation)